Nathan "Nate" Henry is the lead singer and bassist for the indie rock band Sherwood. The band officially announced their breakup in February 2012. He, Dan Koch, and Chris Armstrong formed the band in 2002 while they were attending college in San Luis Obispo, California. He and Dan Koch composed all of Sherwood's songs, and Henry directed Sherwood's first music video "Song in My Head". According to the Sherwood Show pilot episode, Henry created the show.

Pre-Sherwood

Henry grew up in Carmichael, California a suburb of Sacramento, the youngest of four children, and attended and graduated from Victory Christian High School in Carmichael. While in high school, Henry started and played in various local bands. He shared the stage with some smaller nationally touring acts and began learning the ways of the music industry. He originally met Sherwood's present guitarist and former drummer Dan Koch at Cal Poly in San Luis Obispo, California in late 2002. Once together, they collectively masterminded the band with guitarist Chris Armstrong as a three piece until they found a direction for their sound. Sherwood officially became a band one year later when the group changed their name and envisioned a more original "pop-rock sound".

Present day work

Nate self-managed Sherwood until just after their sophomore release "A Different Light". He helped negotiate and secure the band's second record deal with Myspace Records in late 2006 according to interviews. Nate was largely responsible for the band's branding and promotional content. He wrote and directed Sherwood's first official music video "Song in My Head" which received over two million streams worldwide and was featured on MTV, FUSE, ENEWS etc. He also wrote and produced a comical web TV series that was very popular with their fans. Nate took on more of song-writing role with Dan Koch and co-penned many of the songs on Sherwood's final album "QU" which debuted first week on billboards top 100 charts.

Henry co-hosts a top 75 Science podcast with Luke Rodgers called Blurry Creatures. The podcast launched in the summer of 2020. This fringe podcast is all about creatures described in the bible and other ancient texts. The podcast has been charting in the nature section in 10+ countries and continues to find a bigger audience. The show is a marriage between biblical theology and modern day creature sightings packaged with an 80's theme. They have a unique blend of fringe material via a biblical worldview. Does the bible talk about Bigfoot? Henry and Rodgers think so and are out to prove it.

Post-Sherwood

After Sherwood disbanded in February 2012, Henry announced he wanted to make a new album. Henry was able to fund a new record completely by his fans. Collectively 413 people donated a total of $15,918 to help him finish the record.
Henry produced and released a promotional video for the album fundraiser, as well as the album's first single, "All We've Got," under the band name "The Begging Sea." The album, entitled "The Distance" was then released in the summer of 2013. Henry is now producing and slowly releasing videos to promote the album. 
 
Henry lives in Hendersonville, Tennessee with his wife and two kids. Henry has been doing more free-lance video work for various artists. He recently finished promotional videos showcasing new songs from Relient K and Aaron Sprinkle. Besides writing music and videos, Henry has proclaimed his love for baseball, video editing, podcasting, and a deep desire to know truth.

References

Interviews
Interview with Nate Henry and Dan Koch

American rock bass guitarists
American male bass guitarists
American rock singers
People from San Luis Obispo, California
Living people
People from Carmichael, California
Year of birth missing (living people)